The Tragedy of Deaf Sam-yong (translit. Biryeonui beongeori samyong) is a 1973 South Korean drama film directed by Byun Jang-ho. The film was selected as the South Korean entry for the Best Foreign Language Film at the 46th Academy Awards, but was not accepted as a nominee.

Cast
 Kim Hee-ra
 Yun Yeong-kyeong
 Shin Yeong-il
 Choi In-suk

See also
 List of submissions to the 46th Academy Awards for Best Foreign Language Film
 List of South Korean submissions for the Academy Award for Best Foreign Language Film

References

External links
 
 

1973 films
1973 drama films
South Korean drama films
1970s Korean-language films
Films directed by Byun Jang-ho